Abraham Bennett "Benny" Lester (10 February 1920 – 1958) was an English footballer who played for Hull City, Lincoln City and Stockport County in the Football League.

References

1920 births
1958 deaths
Footballers from Sheffield
English footballers
Association football forwards
Selby Town F.C. players
Hull City A.F.C. players
Lincoln City F.C. players
Stockport County F.C. players
English Football League players